Peeling the Onion is an autobiographical work by German Nobel Prize-winning author and playwright Günter Grass, published in 2006. It begins with the end of his childhood in Danzig (Gdansk) when the Second World War breaks out, and ends with the author finishing his first great literary success, The Tin Drum.

2006 non-fiction books
German books
Literary autobiographies
Works by Günter Grass